Martin Gang ( – ), was an American lawyer. Gang was a graduate of Harvard and the Boalt Law School, and was known for providing legal aid to victims of the 1940s and 1950s Hollywood blacklist. Martin Gang was involved in the founding of the American law firm now known as Gang, Tyre, Ramer, Brown & Passman, Inc. (originally Gang, Kopp, and Brown), and remained within the firm from 1931 to his death.

Legacy

Gang worked to dissolve the Hollywood blacklist, from when it was founded in 1947 to its end. In the 1950s, he provided legal representation to movie industry workers who cooperated with the House Un-American Activities Committee and was a leading member of the American Jewish Committee. In 1951, Gang represented Gene Autry in a lawsuit against Republic Studios. Other distinguished clients that Martin Gang worked with include George Burns, Bob Hope, Olivia de Havilland, Myrna Loy, Lucille Ball, and Frank Sinatra.

Furthermore, Gang was one of the McCarthy era's most frequent "clearance" lawyers in Hollywood. He devised methods of allowing publicly known communist-sympathizers to avoid the studio blacklists and counseled his clients in cooperating with the House Un-American Activities Committee (HUAC). This included admitting their connection to communism, fully repudiating their former beliefs, and sharing information on former friends, colleagues, and acquaintances who were involved in communist groups. To retain his client's interest in keeping their employment, he resided to counseling them to 'name names'. Gang claimed that he "had a responsibility to [his] client and their lives".

Martin Gang's other legacies include acting as a retainer to a faction of the Screen Directors Guild that were fighting efforts by another faction to impose a loyalty oath on members in the 1950s. Additionally, he rescued members of his extended family living in Vienna, Austria from Hitler's Holocaust. In the media, Martin Gang played a role in the 1991 movie Guilty by Suspicion and Auf Wiedersehen: ’Til We Meet Again, which documented the aforementioned rescue of his family.

References
 
 
 
 

1901 births
1998 deaths
California lawyers
Hollywood blacklist
Harvard University alumni
UC Berkeley School of Law alumni
20th-century American lawyers